Leprosy Control (LepCo or LEPCO) is a non-governmental organization addressing leprosy.  The organization has been active in countries such as Afghanistan.

References

Leprosy organizations